A Talonear!! (Let's Walk Around) (2007) is the 26th album by Mexican rock and blues band El Tri, based in Mexico City.

Reception
The AllMusic review by Alex Henderson awarded the album four stars stating "Some of yesterday's angry young men have mellowed with time and let go of much of their youthful passion, but not Alejandro Lora... the longtime leader of El Tri is every bit as edgy, ballsy, and gutsy as he was back in the '70s and '80s—which is not to say that anger is the only thing that Lora expresses on this engaging rock en español album... . Longtime fans of El Tri will be happy to know that after all these years, Lora is still very much on top of his game throughout the excellent A Talonear."

Track listing 
All songs were written by Alex Lora except where noted.
 "A Talonear II" (Let's Walk Around) – 3:24 minutes
 "Bésame" (Kiss Me) – 4:05
 "Nunca Es Tarde" (It's Never Too Late) – 3:56
 "La Diferencia" (The Difference) – 4:41
 "Aquí Nadie Me Quiere" (No One Wants Me Here) (Lora, José Martell Peralta) – 3:32
 "Como No" (What Do You Mean, No) – 5:28
 "Dora Mitzi" (Daniel Flores, Lora) – 4:41
 "Mañana" (Tomorrow) (Chela Lora, Lora) – 3:28
 "Tenemos Que Hacer el Amor" (We Have to Make Love) – 4:12
 "Que Padre Es Soñar" (How Awesome It Is To Dream) – 3:33

Personnel 
 Alex Lora – guitar, vocals, producer, mixing
 Rafael Salgado – harmonic
 Eduardo Chico – guitar
 Oscar Zarate – guitar
 Carlos Valerio – bass
 Chela Lora – backing vocals
 Ramon Perez – drums

Guest musicians 
Javier Aguirre – trombone
Arturo Labastida – saxophone

Technical 
Craig Brock – cowbell, engineer, production assistant
David Bojorges – mastering
Raúl Duran – production assistant

References

External links 
www.eltri.com.mx
A Talonear at MusicBrainz
[ A Talonear] at AllMusic

El Tri albums
2007 albums